Clement of Sardis is numbered among the Seventy Disciples. He was Bishop of Sardis. The Church remembers St. Clement on January 4 with the Seventy; April 22 with Ss. Nathaniel and Luke;  and on September 10 with Ss. Apelles and Lucius.

References

Sources
St. Nikolai Velimirovic, The Prologue from Ohrid

External links

Apostle Clement of the Seventy, April 22 (OCA)
Apostle Clement of the Seventy, September 10 (OCA)

Seventy disciples
1st-century bishops in Roman Anatolia
Bishops of Sardis